Collierville may refer to:
 Collierville, California
 Collierville, Tennessee